Duncan Kibet (born 25 April 1978) is a runner from Kenya. He became the second fastest marathoner ever with a time of 2:04:27 hours, when he won the 2009 Rotterdam Marathon.

Career
Kibet dropped out of school in 1997 due to financial problems. He did not run competitively until after encouraged by his elder brother Luke Metto, who had some success as a runner at the turn of the century. He also followed Luke by moving to France, participating in local races. He won the Lille Half Marathon in 2004. Kibet started marathoning without major success. He finished 8th at the 2002 Monaco Marathon and 2nd at the 2004 Caen Marathon. He had also been in a car accident at age of 16, almost losing his ability to walk. During his early career he was afraid to run and train seriously, fearing he would break his leg again.

His younger brother Shadrack Biwott got a scholarship in the USA and arranged for Kibet to run some races there. Kibet won the inaugural Rock 'n' Roll Half Marathon in San Jose in 2006 by running 1:00:22. It was then the 2nd fastest half marathon time in the United States, after Haile Gebrselassie, who had run faster earlier that year. Kibet also won the 2007 Beach to Beacon 10k in a time of 27:51, besting a fast field over a tough, hilly course.

Kibet was a pacemaker for Gebrselassie at the 2008 Dubai Marathon where Gebrselassie failed to break the world marathon record already held by himself, but set the 2nd fastest marathon time (2:04:53 hours) at the time.

Kibet made his full marathon debut at the 2008 Vienna Marathon, finishing 2nd behind compatriot Abel Kirui and setting 2:08:33 hours. Later the same year he won the Milan Marathon, breaking the course record by running 2:07:53 hours.

Kibet won the Rotterdam Marathon on 5 April 2009, posting the 3rd fastest marathon time ever, 2:04:27 hours and was closely followed by James Kwambai who set the same time. Abel Kirui, who had beaten Kibet in 2008 in Vienna was now third also with a fast time (2:05:04 hours). The only one to have run faster marathons at the time was Haile Gebrselassie, who set world records at the 2007 and 2008 Berlin Marathons (2:04:26 and 2.03:59 hours, respectively), although in 2011, Geoffrey Mutai and Moses Mosop ran 2:03:02 and 2:03:06, respectively, on a point-to-point course not eligible for world record status, while Patrick Makau ran 2:03:38 for a new world record, and Wilson Kipsang ran 2:03:42 for the new 2nd best mark. The time was also a Kenyan record, beating Paul Tergat's world record time 2:04:55 set at the 2003 Berlin Marathon.

He is known for his bearded appearance as well as for wearing jewellery when running. He is nicknamed "Jamaican" and "Rasta" by fellow runners.
 
Kibet is married. His siblings, including Luke Metto, are also runners. His younger brother Shadrack Kiptoo-Biwott is an All-American runner at the University of Oregon. Duncan and Luke have a combined personal best marathon time of 4:15:24, a "world record" for siblings. The time is five seconds better than the combined time of Eric and Boaz Kimaiyo.

He is managed by the Rosa Associati led by Federico Rosa.

Achievements
All results regarding marathon and half marathon

References

External links

Marathoninfo profile

1978 births
Living people
Kenyan male long-distance runners
Kenyan male marathon runners
20th-century Kenyan people
21st-century Kenyan people